UR Airlines is an international airline based in Iraq. It operates a small narrow-body fleet, with its own services from Baghdad and Najaf, and services operated on behalf of FlyErbil from Erbil. Some flights from Erbil are operated by GetJet Airlines using the UR Airlines IATA and ICAO codes.

Destinations

As of August 2021, UR Airlines operates flights to the following destinations:

Fleet

Current fleet
As of August 2021, the UR Airlines fleet consists of the following aircraft:

Previously operated
 Boeing 737-400 (UR-CQW, 4L-AAK — both returned to lessors)

References

External links

Airlines established in 2019
Iraqi brands
Airlines of Iraq
Iraqi companies established in 2019